Karma Nightclub & Cabaret (formerly The Q/Club Q) was a gay nightclub in downtown Lincoln, Nebraska.  Originally opened as The Q in April 1995, it closed abruptly following a Halloween event in 2013, and re-opened months later under new ownership as Karma.  The establishment housing the club was lost to a fire on January 31, 2015.

The club existed in a non-descript building with spare outdoor lighting, in an area southwest of Lincoln's primary downtown bar district, and southeast of the Haymarket.  It was by far Lincoln's largest and most prominent gay club, with a full theatrical stage, 15,000-watt sound system, and 6,000 sq ft surrounding the primary bar and dance floor.

Re-branding 
After The Q shut its doors on November 1, 2013, it was revealed by local news sources that the establishment had been in arrears with payments to the IRS, as well as in debt to private lenders—though this did not contribute directly to The Q's closing.  The club claimed it could not sustain itself for the week after a deposit of $3,000 was stolen from the bar, asking patrons to return the following weekend, however the club remained closed.

Following a period of uncertain fate, the nightclub re-opened under new ownership about three months later, on January 24, 2014.  Approximately $100,000 in remodeling brought a new central bar design and skylights to the main room, however no pivotal changes were made to the club's operation.

Fire 
On Saturday, January 31, 2015, the building housing Karma was lost in a four-alarm fire which began in the stage area about 7:15 pm, ahead of a planned night of performances.  The fire gutted the building, resulting in a roof collapse and a loss of power to surrounding areas.

References 

1995 establishments in Nebraska
1995 in LGBT history
Buildings and structures in Lincoln, Nebraska
Defunct LGBT nightclubs in the United States
LGBT history in Nebraska